It was customary in the European Middle Ages, more precisely in the period of scholasticism which extended into early modern times, to designate the more celebrated among the doctors of theology and law by epithets or surnames which were supposed to express their characteristic excellence or dignity. The following list exhibits the principal surnames with the dates of death. 

See also Doctor of the Church and List of Latinised names

Alphabetical lists, by accolade

Doctors in theology

Doctors in law

Other medieval accolades

See also

 Lists of nicknames – nickname list articles on Wikipedia

Notes

References
Frederick Copleston, A History of Philosophy, Vol. III, p. 427.

Attribution

Latin Nicknames Of The Middle Ages